The Cauchy formula for repeated integration, named after Augustin-Louis Cauchy, allows one to compress n antidifferentiations of a function into a single integral (cf. Cauchy's formula).

Scalar case
Let f be a continuous function on the real line.  Then the nth repeated integral of f with basepoint a,

is given by single integration

Proof
A proof is given by induction. The base case with n=1 is trivial, since it is equivalent to:
Now, suppose this is true for n, and let us prove it for n+1. Firstly, using the Leibniz integral rule, note that

Then, applying the induction hypothesis,

This completes the proof.

Generalizations and applications
The two formulas agree when . 

Both the Cauchy formula and the Riemann-Liouville integral are generalized to arbitrary dimension by the Riesz potential.

In fractional calculus, these formulae can be used to construct a differintegral, allowing one to differentiate or integrate a fractional number of times. Differentiating a fractional number of times can be accomplished by fractional integration, then differentiating the result.

References
 Augustin-Louis Cauchy: Trente-Cinquième Leçon. In: Résumé des leçons données à l’Ecole royale polytechnique sur le calcul infinitésimal. Imprimerie Royale, Paris 1823. Reprint: Œuvres complètes II(4), Gauthier-Villars, Paris, pp. 5–261.
 Gerald B. Folland, Advanced Calculus, p. 193, Prentice Hall (2002).

External links

Augustin-Louis Cauchy
Integral calculus
Theorems in analysis